Jon Hicks was the former editor-in-chief of the UK edition of the Official Xbox Magazine between 2007 and 2014. He wrote the first published review of Rockstar Games' Grand Theft Auto IV.

Hicks previously worked on the launch of Windows Vista: The Official Magazine and has written for many print publications including PC Gamer, PC Format, GamesMaster, PC Zone, SFX, Edge, PC Plus, .net, Windows XP Magazine, Stuff, and The Mail on Sunday.

See also
Official Xbox Magazine
PC Gamer

References

External links
OXM Announces New Editor
Joystiq: First Grand Theft Auto IV Review

Living people
Year of birth missing (living people)
British male journalists